Pudhiya Sagaptham is a 1985 Indian Tamil-language drama film directed by Visu. The film stars Vijayakanth, Ambika and Visu. It was released on 2 May 1985, and failed commercially.

Plot 

Uma finds a job in a college library after she impressed Vijay, a college student, who becomes the school leader. Uma's father kills her stepmother and commits suicide, leaving her and his three children alone. Ramadasaradan joins the college for a mysterious reason which only Uma knows. Ramadasaradan links secretly Vijay and Uma by writing the wrong relationship between them, so Uma is fired. When Vijay goes to her house, he sees a photo of Uma with her husband. The college watchman tells Vijay the truth and Vijay asks Ramadasaradan why he did it. Visu tells him that her husband is dead and he was her father-in-law. His son Deepak, a heart patient married Uma. Deepak died at his wedding night, Uma became a widow and she quit his house, but Ramadasaradan challenged her to find a husband. Ramadasaradan and Vijay try to make her accept the marriage in many ways. Finally, she marries Vijay.

Cast 

Vijayakanth as Vijay
Ambika as Uma
Visu as Ramadasaradan
Karthik as Deepak (guest appearance)
Vinodhini as Shanthi
Kishmu as achuthan nair
Sivachandran as Manager Chandran
T. P. Gajendran as Gajendran

Soundtrack 
The music was composed by Gangai Amaran, with lyrics written by himself, Pulamaipithan, N. Kamarasan and Idhayachandra.

References

External links 
 

1980s Tamil-language films
1985 films
Films directed by Visu
Films scored by Gangai Amaran
Films with screenplays by Visu
Indian drama films